Eamonn Keane may refer to:

 Eamonn Keane (weightlifter), Irish school teacher and endurance weightlifter
 Eamonn Keane (actor) (1925–1990), Irish actor